Ajit Bandyopadhyay (alternative spelling Ajit Bandopadhyay or Ajit Banerjee) was a Bengali film and theater actor, director, art director.

Filmography

Actor
1950 Michael Madhusudhan (as Ajit Bannerjee)
1950 Sheshbesh (as Ajit Bannerjee)
1951 Niyoti
1951 Pandit Mashai Brindaban (as Ajit Bannerjee)
1952 Bindur Chheley Madhab
1952 Nagarik (as Sagar)
1954 Maraner Pare: Dr. Paresh Banerjee
1956 Asabarna
1957 Khela Bhangar Khela
1958 Maa Shitala (as Ajit Bannerjee)
1959 Neel Akasher Neechey (as Ajit Bandyopadhyay)
1962 Bhagini Nivedita
1962 The Expedition
1963 Uttar Falguni
1971 Prothom Kdam Phool
1971 Nimantran (as Ajit Bandopadhyay)
1975 Chorus (as Asit Bannerjee)
1977 Mrigayaa
1985 Till Theke Tal
1987 Lalan Fakir
1989 Sati (as Ajit Bandyopadhyay)
1990 Shakha Proshakha: Ananda Majumdar (as Ajit Bandyopadhyay)
1991 Agantuk: Sital Sarkar (as Ajit Bandyopadhyay)
1992 Indrajit
1992 Goopy Bagha Phire Elo: Brahmananda Acharya
1996 Baksho Rahashya: Uncle Sidhu (as Ajit Bandyopadhyay)
1996 Damu

Director
1970 Ae Korechho Bhalo.
1979 Ami Ratan.
1987 Radharani.

Art director
1961 Mem-Didi
1961 Anuradha
1962 Asli-Naqli
1966 Anupama
1967 Majhli Didi
1968 Anokhi Raat
1968 Aashirwad
1969 Satyakam.
1971 Mere Apne.
1971 Guddi.

Awards
1969 Best Art Director - Black and White for Majhli Didi (1967).
1970 Best Art Director - Black and White for Anokhi Raat (1968).

See also
Utpal Dutt

References

External links

Bengali theatre personalities
20th-century Indian male actors
Bengali male actors
Male actors in Bengali cinema
Indian art directors
Bengali film directors
Living people
20th-century Bengalis
21st-century Bengalis
20th-century Indian film directors
Year of birth missing (living people)